A heat pack is designed to warm up one's body to prevent swelling of injuries. A heat pack can be:
 an ice pack that is heated (containing a liquid or a gel with high specific heat)
 a heating pad that heats when you start the crystallisation process